The 2019–20 Liga de Ascenso season is the 99th season since its establishment. The tournament is divided into two championships, the Apertura and Clausura, each in an identical format and each contested by 12 teams.

Teams
A total of 18 teams compete in the 2019–20 Liga de Ascenso and separate into two Groups of 9 with the top four progressing to the final stages of the Apertura and Clausura sections.

Apertura

Regular season

Group A

Group B

Playoffs

Quarterfinals

|}

Semifinals

|}

Final

|}

Clausura

Regular season

Group A

Group B

Playoffs

Quarterfinals

|}

Semifinals

|}

Final

|}

Aggregate table

Relegation playoffs

|}

References

External links

Seasons in Costa Rican football